The University of Home Economics Lahore is a public university located in Lahore, Pakistan. It was founded in 1955 to create a center for teaching and research in the field of Home Economics.

On 8 February 2017, Punjab assembly passed the bill to upgrade it from college to university. Prof. Dr. Kanwal Ameen is the first vice-chancellor and joined on 31 May 2019.

Degree programs
It has got HEC recognition and offers FA (Home Economics) FSc.(Pre-Medical),The 3rd Syndicate has approved BS (4years) in: (i) Human Nutrition & Dietetics (ii) Textile Design (iii) Fashion Design (iv) Human Development & Family Studies (v) Sociology (vi) Art & Design (vii) Interior Design (viii) Hospitality & Tourism Management (ix) Home Economics

MS (2years) degree programs in: (i) MS Food & Nutrition (ii) MS Textile & Clothing (iii) MS Human Development & Family Studies (iv) MS Art & Design (v) MS Interior Design

The University also offers Graduate and Post Graduate diplomas. Its own selected MPhil programs will be stratred from 2020 and PhD from 2021. 

The institution is making speedy progress as a University since June 2019.

See also
Ra'ana Liaquat Ali Khan, Government College of Home Economics (RLAK CHE), Karachi
List of colleges in Pakistan

External links
 University of Home Economics Lahore

References

Women's universities and colleges in Pakistan
Public universities and colleges in Punjab, Pakistan
Universities and colleges in Lahore